Dorcadion accola is a species of beetle in the family Cerambycidae. It was described by Heyden in 1894. It is known from Turkey.

References

accola
Beetles described in 1894